Wrestling at the 2000 Summer Olympics took place in the Sydney Convention and Exhibition Centre and was split into two disciplines, Freestyle and Greco-Roman which are further divided into different weight categories. The freestyle competitions were held from 28 September to 1 October, and the Greco-Roman events were held from 24 to 27 September. In the freestyle 76 kg Alexander Leipold of Germany originally placed first, but was disqualified after he tested positive for Nandrolone.

Qualification

Medalists

Freestyle

Greco-Roman

Medal table

Participating nations
A total of 314 wrestlers from 55 nations competed at the Sydney Games:

References

External links
International Olympic Committee results database

 
2000 Summer Olympics events
2000 in sport wrestling
2000
International wrestling competitions hosted by Australia